The 69th parallel south is a circle of latitude that is 69 degrees south of the Earth's equatorial plane, in the Antarctic. It crosses the Southern Ocean and Antarctica.

Around the world
Starting at the Prime Meridian and heading eastwards, the parallel 69° south passes through:

{| class="wikitable plainrowheaders"
! scope="col" width="125" | Co-ordinates
! scope="col" | Continent or ocean
! scope="col" | Notes
|-
| style="background:#b0e0e6;" | 
! scope="row" style="background:#b0e0e6;" | Southern Ocean
| style="background:#b0e0e6;" | King Haakon VII Sea, south of the Atlantic Ocean
|-
| 
! scope="row" | Antarctica
| Queen Maud Land, claimed by 
|-
| style="background:#b0e0e6;" | 
! scope="row" style="background:#b0e0e6;" | Southern Ocean
| style="background:#b0e0e6;" | Lützow-Holm Bay,  King Haakon VII Sea, south of the Indian Ocean
|-
| 
! scope="row" rowspan="2" | Antarctica
| Queen Maud Land, claimed by 
|-
| 
| Enderby Land, Kemp Land, Mac. Robertson Land, claimed by 
|-
| style="background:#b0e0e6;" | 
! scope="row" style="background:#b0e0e6;" | Southern Ocean
| style="background:#b0e0e6;" | Prydz Bay, Cooperation Sea, south of the Indian Ocean
|-
| 
! scope="row" rowspan="3"| Antarctica
| Princess Elizabeth Land, Wilhelm II Land, Queen Mary Land, Wilkes Land, claimed by 
|-
| 
| Adélie Land, claimed by 
|-
| 
| George V Land, claimed by 
|-
| style="background:#b0e0e6;" | 
! scope="row" style="background:#b0e0e6;" | Southern Ocean
| style="background:#b0e0e6;" | South of the Pacific Ocean Passing south of Peter I Island
|-
| 
! scope="row" | Antarctica
|-
| style="background:#b0e0e6;" | 
! scope="row" style="background:#b0e0e6;" | Southern Ocean
| style="background:#b0e0e6;" | Marguerite Bay, Bellingshausen Sea, south of the Drake Passage
|-
| 
! scope="row" | Antarctica
|-
| style="background:#b0e0e6;" | 
! scope="row" style="background:#b0e0e6;" | Southern Ocean
| style="background:#b0e0e6;" | Weddell Sea, south of the Atlantic Ocean
|-
| 
! scope="row" | Antarctica
| Queen Maud Land, claimed by 
|}

See also
68th parallel south
70th parallel south

s69